Dev.D is a 2009 Indian Hindi-language romantic black comedy film released on 6 February 2009. Written and directed by Anurag Kashyap, it is a modern-day take on Sarat Chandra Chattopadhyay's classic Bengali novel Devdas, previously adapted for the screen by P.C. Barua and Bimal Roy and more recently by Sanjay Leela Bhansali. Dev.D received positive critical reviews. The film is set in contemporary Punjab and Delhi, where familial ties are negotiated by the traditional system and marriages are a game of power and a matter of honour.

Plot

The film is divided into three parts from the point of view of the main characters :-

Paro
Paro is an idealistic, young, middle-class girl living in Punjab. Her childhood sweetheart is Dev, the son of a rich businessman. Paro cares for him immensely, and fully expects a future with him.
Dev constantly takes Paro's love and affection for granted. He grows up to be arrogant and lazy, which causes his father to send him to London to complete his education. While separated by distance, Paro and Dev's youthful love only blossoms more, despite Dev becoming increasingly more egotistical and entitled. After finishing his studies, Dev returns to Chandigarh and meets Paro, and they rekindle their romance. After some time, Dev overhears scandalous rumours about Paro concerning her reputation and sexual history, which he immediately believes. Paro is shocked to see Dev's chauvinist attitude towards her, even after she claims innocence. Dev hypocritically passes judgement on Paro and does not approve of the things that he has heard. Paro turns her back on him when she hears him insult her and rashly agrees to marry a man of her parents' choice. On her wedding day, Dev learns that the rumors were false but his ego doesn't let him accept his mistake, and he lets Paro marry someone else.

Chanda
Leni is a Delhi student of half-European descent. A date with her much older boyfriend turns sexual and lands Leni in an MMS sex scandal. The incident becomes public knowledge after the video is widely circulated. Her father, having watched the video, commits suicide out of shame and disgust, and Leni's family decides to send her to live in a small rural town. Refusing to live a life of shame and ridicule, she returns to Delhi where she works as a prostitute at night, while continuing with her studies during the day. She adopts the name 'Chanda' for her profession. Her 'foreign' looks mean her services are reserved for the highest-paying customers and she finds some dignity and independence in the new way of living. One night, an inebriated, half-conscious customer is brought to her room – it turns out to be Dev.

Dev
Dev, tormented by Paro's wedding, has been seeking refuge in alcohol and drugs. He finds some solace with Chanda but is unable to forget Paro. While in a drug fueled haze, he calls Paro's husband in the middle of the night, Paro visits him at the cheap lodge where he is staying. She shows her love by taking care of him but spurns his attempts at physical intimacy. The meeting ends on a bitter note, and Paro returns to her married life. Dev resolves to go back to Chanda, but confronted by the reality of her profession, he abandons her, too. He resumes his destructive lifestyle of alcohol, drugs, and reckless behaviour. Months later, after his life has completely fallen apart and hit an all-time low, Dev attempts to pick up the pieces. He seeks Chanda once again and, with her help, sets out to start life afresh.

Cultural references
 Kalki's character is a modern adaptation of Chandramukhi, who was most recently played by Madhuri Dixit in Sanjay Leela Bhansali's Devdas. In the film, the young Leni is shown to be a fan of Madhuri's, listening to the songs of Chandramukhi. When she takes up prostitution as profession, she adopts the name Chandramukhi or Chanda, in honor of the character.
 Chanda's back story in which she gets embroiled in an MMS scandal while in school is a reference to a similar scandal that took place at Delhi Public School, R.K. Puram in 2004. 
 Later in the film, when Dev is depressed after losing both Paro and Chanda, he is driving his new BMW while heavily drunk. This is a reference to the Sanjeev Nanda BMW hit-and-run case in 1999.

Cast
 Abhay Deol as Devendra Singh "Dev" Dhillon
 Mahie Gill as Parminder "Paro"
 Kalki Koechlin as Leni/Chandramukhi (Chanda)
 Dibyendu Bhattacharya as Chunni Lal
 Parakh Madan as Rasika Singh
 Gurkirtan as Satpal Singh Dhillon 'Sattu'- Dev's father
 Satwant Kaur as Kaushalya Dhillon- Dev's mother
 Shena Gamat as Welcome Hotel Owner 
 Binnu Dhillon as Dwij Singh Dhillon (Dev's brother)
 Kuldeep Sharma as Manager Uncle (Paro's father)
 Sanjay Kumar as Leni's father
 Helen Jones as Leni's mother
 Asim Sharma as Bhuvan Singh (Paro's husband and Rasika's brother)
 Naveen Kaushik as Bimal Barua (Dhillon's Lawyer)
 Aekansh Vats as Junior Dev 
 Sasha Shetty as Junior Paro
 Anjum Batra as Sunil
 Ashu Sharma as Canadian Boy
Nawazuddin Siddiqui as Band singer in the song "Emotional Attyachar"
 Nitin Chainpuri as Band singer in the song "Emotional Attyachar"
Chainpuri resembles such a strong likelihood to actor-comedian Sunil Grover in the music video that people initially mistook him to be Grover, who, however, denied his involvement in the film
 Anurag Kashyap as Chanda's customer

Production

Origins
The original idea of film was suggested by Abhay Deol to Anurag Kashyap, who then worked on the script along with Vikramaditya Motwane, using "news headlines about Generation X" to give a youth feel. Dev.D was produced by Ronnie Screwvala and shot in places including Paharganj in central Delhi. For the scenes where Dev is high, British director Danny Boyle suggested the use of a still camera as Kashyap did not have the budget for special effects.

Development
Kashyap did not want another remake of any of the nine film versions titled Devdas. Kashyap wanted to make his own version of Devdas to reflect the original novel but through 2008 mores, with the lead character of Devdas as a debauching, hypocritical sensualist, who is self-destructive without knowing it. Talking about the story and his role as Dev, Abhay Deol told Radio Sargam, "The story is very much from the book which I've read in English. I have played the character according to my interpretation of the book. His character was contemporary, he was quite urban in many ways, he's misplaced in the surrounding and has a spoilt, obsessive and addictive personality."

Initial delays
After the box office disaster of Kashyap's No Smoking, it was rumoured that United Television (UTV) had backed out of the director's next project, Dev.D, starring Abhay Deol. But, according to sources, UTV had signed Abhay for three projects and the actor had blocked dates from November 2007 to March 2008 for Kashyap's film, as the idea was to wrap up the film in one schedule. When Dev.D hit initial snags and was stalled, it was rumoured that UTV had backed out. At that time, the director denied these rumours. He explained the delay by saying that he was still looking out for his Chandramukhi and had locked in Abhay and newcomer Mahi Gill. It was further delayed as he took more time to find an actress suitable for the role of Chandramukhi, which he eventually found with Kalki Koechlin, who was one of the last to be auditioned.

Box office
Dev.D had opening day collection of Rs 15 million. The movie picked up in box office soon and recovered its budget of Rs 60 million in a few weeks. The net collection in its first four weeks was nearly Rs 150 million. Dev.D crossed added another 3 million in week 6. The film's final domestic gross was Rs 215.0 million with distributor share of Rs 65.5 million. The film was declared a 'Hit'.

Reception
Reviews to the film were positive. The widespread acclaim was chiefly due to its fearless visual style, its experimental soundtrack and the innovative narrative structure which included dividing the script into chapters as in the films of Quentin Tarantino. Rony D'Costa of Box Office India gave it 4 stars out of 5, stating "Missing Dev.D would be an 'Emotional Attyachar' to oneself." Raja Sen of Rediff.com gave Dev.D 3.5/5, calling it a 'fantastic visual ride', and ranked it No 2 in his list of the best movies of 2009. Times of India reviewer Nikhat Kazmi termed the film a "brilliant breakthrough for Bollywood" and rated it 5/5. Shubhra Gupta of Indian Express praised the performance of Abhay Deol and the movie overall. Hindustan Times praised the film for its "slick style and adventurous interpretation that pushes the boundaries of Hindi cinema" and rating it as 3.5/5. Noyon Jyoti Parasara of AOL India was "completely bowled out by the movie" and stated, "go and watch Dev.D and be blown away by a sample of what Anurag Kashyap is capable of as a director. Shahrukh Khan praised Abhay Deol's efforts and said that Abhay is contributing to the new era of Indian film industry."

Awards

National Film Awards 2009
 Won: Best Music Direction: Amit Trivedi

55th Filmfare Awards 
Won

 Best Actress (Critics) – Mahie Gill
 Best Supporting Actress – Kalki Koechlin
 R. D. Burman Award for New Music Talent – Amit Trivedi
 Best Cinematography – Rajeev Ravi
 Best Production Design – Helen Jones & Sukanta Panigrahi
 Best Background Score – Amit Trivedi

Nominated

 Best Film – Ronnie Screwvala
 Best Director – Anurag Kashyap
 Best Music Director – Amit Trivedi

2nd Mirchi Music Awards
 Won: Upcoming Lyricist of The Year : Amitabh Bhattacharya for "Emosanal Attyachar (Brass Band Version)"
 Won: Upcoming Female Vocalist of The Year : Aditi Singh Sharma for "Yahi Meri Zindagi"

Others
 Nominated at 2009 Asia Pacific Screen Awards at Queensland Australia
 Dev.D premiered at the 2010 Palm Springs International Film Festival.

Soundtrack

Dev.D has 18 tracks by artiste Amit Trivedi. The songs were written by Amitabh Bhattacharya, Shellee, Anusha Mani, and Shruti Pathak. Released on 31 December under T-Series, he specifically reports that there are two special Punjabi tracks, one which is raw Punjabi and the other with a street band baaja flavor to it. He also reports two romantic Haryanvi folk tracks, apart from a hard rock song, world music, an Awadhi number and a song with 1970s-80s pop touch to it. The soundtrack received overwhelmingly positive reviews. Critic Joginder Tuteja said, "Chuck the very thought around whether this album will do well commercially or not; it is an exemplary piece of work and that's what that matters most." Ekansh Aatre, critic of Hindustan Times fame, said "Each part of each song in this album is special & gives a great impact on audience."

The song "O Pardesi" was replicated using a cycle as a Sprite commercial quotient and is available on YouTube with 140K+ views in the first 24 hours. The song "Emosanal Attyachaar" has become a catch phrase for many Indian youth. Nikhil Taneja of Hindustan Times noted that the song was "singularly responsible for driving audiences to the theater to watch a movie."

References

External links
 
 
 

2009 films
2000s Hindi-language films
2009 black comedy films
2009 romantic comedy-drama films
2000s sex comedy films
2000s erotic drama films
Devdas films
Films about alcoholism
Films about drugs
Films about prostitution in India
Films directed by Anurag Kashyap
Films set in Delhi
Films shot in Chandigarh
Films shot in Delhi
Films shot in Himachal Pradesh
Films shot in London
Indian black comedy films
Indian romantic comedy-drama films
Indian erotic drama films
Indian sex comedy films
UTV Motion Pictures films
Films scored by Amit Trivedi
Films with screenplays by Anurag Kashyap
2009 comedy films